Derriaghy railway station is located in the townland of Derriaghy in County Antrim, Northern Ireland. It lies between the centres of Belfast and Lisburn.

The station opened on 9 February 1907 and was closed to passengers between 1953 and 1958.

Service

Extra services operate at peak times, and the service reduces to hourly operation in the evenings.

On Sundays there is an hourly service in each direction.

References

External links 

Railway stations in County Antrim
Railway stations opened in 1907
Railway stations closed in 1953
Railway stations opened in 1958
Reopened railway stations in Northern Ireland
Railway stations served by NI Railways
Railway stations in Northern Ireland opened in the 20th century